Konstantin Andreyevich Yegorov (born 1 June 1900 in St. Petersburg; died 22 July 1973 in Leningrad) was a Soviet Russian football player and coach.

External links
 

1900 births
Footballers from Saint Petersburg
1973 deaths
Russian footballers
Soviet footballers
FC Dynamo Saint Petersburg players
Soviet football managers
FC Zenit Saint Petersburg managers
Association football midfielders